A referendum was held in Ontario, Canada on October 20, 1919 (in conjunction with the 15th provincial election) on the legality of alcoholic beverages and the maintaining of prohibition. Prohibition had been passed by the provincial government in 1916 under the Ontario Temperance Act, though a clause required a referendum to be held in 1919 on whether the Act should be repealed and the previous licensing laws subsequently revived. A subsequent Act in 1919 provided three further questions for consideration, and subsequent implementation on approval. A majority voted against all four questions, and prohibition was maintained.

Referendum questions 
Are you in favour of the repeal of the Ontario Temperance Act?
Are you in favour of the sale of light beer containing not more than two and fifty-one hundredths per cent alcohol weight measure through Government agencies and amendments to the Ontario Temperance Act to permit such sale?
Are you in favour of the sale of light beer containing not more than two and fifty-one hundredths per cent alcohol weight measure in standard hotels in local municipalities that by a majority vote favour such sale and amendments to the Ontario Temperance Act to permit such sale?
Are you in favour of the sale of spirituous and malt liquors through Government agencies and amendments to the Ontario Temperance Act to permit such sale? 

Unlike past prohibition referendums, the four questions were binding upon receiving a majority vote.

Results 

As the majority voted no on all four questions, prohibition was not repealed.

Gallery

See also
 Prohibition in Canada
 Canada Temperance Act
 1894 Ontario prohibition plebiscite
 1902 Ontario prohibition referendum
 1921 Ontario prohibition referendum
 1924 Ontario prohibition referendum

References

Bibliography

1919 in Ontario
1919 referendums
1919 elections in Canada
Ontario prohibition referendums
October 1919 events